Saint George is a town in Dorchester County, South Carolina, United States. The population was 2,084 at the 2010 census, eight fewer than in 2000. It has been the county seat of Dorchester County since the latter's formation from Colleton County in 1897.

Saint George is included within the Charleston-North Charleston-Summerville metropolitan area as defined by the U.S. Office of Management and Budget, and used by the U. S. Census Bureau for statistical purposes only.

History
The town grew on both sides of South Carolina Canal and Railroad Company, one of the first railroads built in the United States and the first to offer scheduled passenger trains pulled by steam locomotives. In the 1970s, Appleby's Methodist Church, Carroll Place, and Indian Fields Methodist Campground were listed on the National Register of Historic Places.

Geography

The town has a total area of 2.7 square miles (6.9 km2), all of it land, according to the United States Census Bureau.

Demographics

2020 census

As of the 2020 United States census, there were 1,843 people, 744 households, and 453 families residing in the town.

2000 census
As of the census of 2000, there were 2,092 people and 804 households residing in the town. The population density was 779.7 people per square mile (301.4/km2). There were 928 housing units at an average density of 345.9 per square mile (133.7/km2). The racial makeup of the town was 51.19% White, 47.22% African American, 0.19% Native American, 0.72% Asian, 0.33% from other races, and 0.33% from two or more races. Hispanic or Latino of any race were 0.91% of the population.

There were 804 households, out of which 30.2% had children under the age of 18 living with them, 42.4% were married couples living together, 19.5% had a female householder with no husband present, and 34.6% were non-families. 32.7% of all households were made up of individuals, and 15.2% had someone living alone who was 65 years of age or older. The average household size was 2.36 and the average family size was 3.00.

In the town, the population was spread out, with 23.9% under the age of 18, 7.6% from 18 to 24, 26.6% from 25 to 44, 22.7% from 45 to 64, and 19.2% who were 65 years of age or older. The median age was 39 years. For every 100 females, there were 91.8 males. For every 100 women age 18 and over, there were 87.4 men.

The median income for a household in the town was $24,651, and the median income for a family was $40,000. Men had a median income of $27,639 versus $19,957 for women. The per capita income for the town was $13,389. About 14.2% of families and 18.7% of the population were below the poverty line, including 22.2% of those under age 18 and 25.2% of those age 65 or over.

Education
St. George has a public library, a branch of the Dorchester County Library.

Arts and culture 
In the mid-1980s, town leaders wanted to create a yearly festival for the city.  After reviewing possible ideas, local grocery store owner John Walters discovered from contacts at Quaker Oats that the upper part of Dorchester County (where Saint George is located) consumes more grits per capita than any other place in the world. In 1986, the first annual World Grits Festival was held. During the festival, which takes place in mid-April, close to 10,000 people flock to the tiny town for food, music, and games. Until 2019, the festival featured a contest in which people rolled in a vat of grits, vying to have the largest weight of grits stick to them. The festival is held annually; it was not held in 2020 or 2021 because of the COVID-19 pandemic but returned in 2022.

References

Towns in Dorchester County, South Carolina
Towns in South Carolina
County seats in South Carolina
Charleston–North Charleston–Summerville metropolitan area